Civil service examinations are examinations implemented in various countries for recruitment and admission to the civil service. They are intended as a method to achieve an effective, rational public administration on a merit system for recruiting prospective politicians and public sector employees.

The most ancient example of such exams were the imperial examinations of ancient China.

Competitive exam 
Competitive examinations are tests where candidates are ranked according to their grades and/or percentile and then top rankers are selected. If the examination is open for n positions, then the first n candidates in ranks pass, the others are rejected. They are used as entrance examinations for university and college admissions such as the Joint Entrance Examination or to secondary schools. Types are civil service examinations, required for positions in the public sector; the U.S. Foreign Service Exam, and the United Nations Competitive Examination. Competitive examinations are considered an egalitarian way to select worthy applicants without risking influence peddling, bias or other concerns.

See also 
 Civil service commission
 EU Concours
 Government procurement
 Public utilities commission
 Invitation to Tender
 Spoils system

References 
 Eno, Robert. 'Song Dynasty Culture: Political Crisis And The Great Turn'. N.p., 2008. Web. 31 Oct. 2015.
 Ebrey, Patricia Buckley. The Cambridge Illustrated History Of China. Cambridge: Cambridge University Press, 1996. Print.
 Afe.easia.columbia.edu,. 'The Song Dynasty In China | Asia Topics In World History'. N.p., 2015. Web. 31 Oct. 2015.

Chinese inventions
Civil services
Civil service examinations
Government recruitment